Henry Hewitt (1818 - 1879) was an English painter of landscapes, who worked mainly in oils and watercolours. Based in Bristol, his style has been called "lyrical and romantic." He exhibited at the Royal Society of British Artists, and his work is on display at Bristol City Museum and Art Gallery.

Within the last 10 years his oil paintings have sold at auction for an average of £1000-£2000, with his watercolours averaging £100-£200.

References

1818 births
1879 deaths
English male painters
British landscape painters
19th-century English painters
19th-century English male artists